Daylesford Abbey is a Roman Catholic monastery of Canons Regular of Premontre, located in Chester County, Pennsylvania, about 20 miles west of Philadelphia. The Abbey is named after Daylesford, Pennsylvania, where the Norbertine Fathers established the foundation that developed into the Abbey.

The Premonstratensian Fathers are also known as Norbertines, after St. Norbert of Xantern who founder of the Order in 1121. Daylesford Abbey is one of two Norbertine Abbeys founded by Abbot Bernard Pennings of De Pere, Wisconsin. Pennings was a Norbertine Priest sent from Berne Abbey, Netherlands, who founded the Premonstratensian Order in the United States.

Willistown Township, Chester County, Pennsylvania, a few miles from the Philadelphia Main Line's Paoli Platform, in the Roman Catholic Archdiocese of Philadelphia.

Norbertines combine a monastic-style life in community with the active ministry of ordained priests. Priests of the Abbey serve in Pennsylvania, Delaware and Chicago.

History
St. Norbert of Xanten founded the Norbertines  Christmas Day, 1121 in Prémontré, France. The son of a wealthy landholder, Norbert was given to life as a Canon (a minor cleric, as Norbert wasn't yet a Priest) of the Collegiate Church in Xanten, Germany, where he is said to have been unfocused and driven by things other than religious life.

Canons of the Church were required to spend time in choir each day, singing several hours according to the various liturgies prescribed by the Catholic Church. Rather than spending his hours in Church, Norbert would go on adventures and hunts, until his conversion experience in 1112, when he become totally committed to the Christian Faith. 

Norbert became a Priest in 1115 and devoted his life to the reform of the clergy under a rule of life established by St. Augustine of Hippo  (who is counted alongside Norbert as a Father of the Premonstratensian Order) which Norbert founded to support his ideal for reform of the Church. In Norbert's lifetime, his fledgling order spread from Ireland to the Holy Land. Wherever he went, people with a zeal for the Church supported his efforts.

In 1125, Norbert went to Antwerp, preaching in opposition to Tanchelm, whose teachings the Catholic Church opposed. The success of Norbert's mission in Antwerp and across the Low Countries, led to the foundation of Norbertine Abbeys in the Netherlands and Belgium. Among these religious communities was Berne Abbey, located in North Brabant, the Netherlands. Berne was established in 1134, the same year as Norbert's death.

Centuries later, Norbertine Priests led by Bernard Pennings, came from Berne and established an Abbey in Wisconsin. Pennings established a network of Norbertine schools and Parishes, establishing St. Norbert College as a seminary, then a college of business. In 1898, St. Joseph Parish, in West De Pere, Wisconsin became affiliated with the Norbetines and served as the Abbey Church for decades.

In the 1950s, a growing American Norbetine community, having outgrown both the Abbey in De Pere and the various priories it had, sought to create new a new Foundation (which would become Daylesford Abbey) and to expand the Norbertine Presence  from Wisconsin to the East Coast of the United States, in Delaware and Philadelphia.

Norbertines in Philadelphia & the Delaware Valley
In 1932, Abbot Pennings sent a handful of Norbertines from Wisconsin to open a school that became Archmere Academy in the Delaware Valley. In the subsequent years, Pennings purchased "The Patio", home of industrialist John J. Raskob  in Claymont, Delaware. At the Patio, the Norbertines created a college preparatory school on grounds of the former estate.

Norbertines in Philadelphia
In 1934, following the success of Archmere Academy in Delaware, the Norbertines were asked to open an archdiocesan high school for boys in South Philadelphia. Originally called, "Southeast Catholic High School", the name was later changed to Bishop Neumann High School, then later still to Saint John Neumann High School.

Many young men from the two schools wanted to become Norbertines. In 1954 at the Cassatt Estate at Daylesford, near Philadelphia, anew priory (with a seminary program) was established.

In 1956 the priory built Saint Norbert Parish in Paoli, PA. In 1963, the Community moved from the Cassatt Estate to Pinebrook, its present site, an 88 acre farm in Paoli. The Abbey Church and Residence buildings were completed in 1966. The church was blessed on August 15, 1967 and dedicated to Our Lady of the Assumption.

Liturgy & Architecture

The Norbertine Order is known for the solemnity of its liturgies, reflecting Norbert's devotion to the Eucharist. Members of the community wear the Order's traditional white habit in Church. The Community chants the daily office from its own liturgical books in English each day, with Marian hymns chanted in Latin.

The Abbey is well known for the chanting of the hours and the beauty of its modern, yet classically oriented Church.

The Abbey's Design

The Abbey Church was completed in the years during Second Vatican Council. It reflects the Liturgical Movement and the reforms of the council, as interpreted with the norms of Catholic tradition in mind. The Abbey Church is built in the basilica style, with a well appointed nave and a wide choir. Its use of terrazo, and concrete poured over rough hewn beams provide an aesthetic of permanence,  grandeur and scale to the austere design.

The design is based on the footprint of centuries-old European Norbertine and Cistercian monasteries, the materials utilized in constructing it were selected for their permanence.

The design reflects the Cistercian ideals of Norbert of Xanten's friend, St. Bernard of Clairvaux. In the lifetime of Bernard and Norbert, the Cistercians represented a similar movement for ecclesiastical reform as Norbert's Premonstratensians.

St. Bernard wrote against the most excessive ornamentation of the Churches in his time, saying, "...in the cloister, in the sight of the reading monks, what is the point of such ridiculous monstrosity, the strange kind of shapely shapelessness? Why these unsightly monkeys, why these fierce lions, why the monstrous centaurs, why semi-humans, why spotted tigers, why fighting soldiers, why trumpeting huntsmen? …In short there is such a variety and such a diversity of strange shapes everywhere that we may prefer to read the marbles rather than the books."

The Abbey's architecture combines simplicity of form and line with a grandiose scale and permanent  material. It is evocative of St. Bernard's ideals, which deeply influenced the thinking of his friend Norbert.

Pipe Organs

Main Church Organ

The abby's major Church organ was built by the Tellers Organ Company, a manufacturer of pipe organs in from 1906 to 1973. The organ was one of Teller's final projects, of the 1970s. The instrument is of fine quality, but was never completed and the builder's design scheme was not realized.

Chapel Organ

The second organ is in side Chapel, where the Norbertines often say Mass. It was constructed by Patrick J. Murphy & Associates, an organ builder located in Stowe, Pennsylvania.

Leadership
Daylesford Abbey is currently headed by Abbot Domenic Rossi, O.Praem . Abbot Domenic is the Daylesford's 5th Abbot.

Like many members of the community, Abbot Domenic hails from South Philadelphia.  He was educated by the Norbertine’s at Bishop Neumann High School (now Ss. John Neumann and Maria Goretti High School .)  Abbot Domenic joined the community in 1966 and was ordained in 1974. He was elected to the position of Abbot in January 2018.

Abbot Domenic's Crest

An Abbatial Coat of Arms identifies the Abbey in which an Abbot belongs, as well as something of his personal background. The Miter and Crozier at the top of the shield identifies his status as an abbot.

The sudarium, or flowing scarf on the crozier (a shepherd's symbol) distinguishes an abbatial coat of arms from that of a bishop. The triangle of three fleurs de lis, on a background of blue, represents the Daylesford Abbey Coat of Arms - indicating the Order's origins in France and Mary as its patroness. The circle in the center of the shield shows Christ hidden in the disguise of a homeless man sitting on a city grate. This reflects Abbot Domenic’s recognition of and call to serve the Lord among the marginalized and abandoned poor.

The Easter Candle, in the lower-left quadrant, recalls that Jesus Christ is the Light for a world in darkness, hence the motto, Christ Our Light.  It also reaffirms the faith of the entire Christian community in its Savior who defied death and gives us all hope that with Him, we too will rise again. The Dove with the olive branch, in the upper right quadrants, reminds us of the Order’s founder, Saint Norbert (also known as Norbert of Xanten), and recommits us to his ministry of peace and reconciliation. The red background in the last two quadrants hints at the meaning of the Rossi surname.

Ministries
The Norbertines at Daylesford Abbey are active in many ministries throughout the Philadelphia region and the Delaware Valley. Norbertines serve at St. Norbert Parish , in Paoli, PA and at St. Gabriel Parish  in South Philadelphia.

Abbot Domenic Rossi, O. Praem., founded  Bethesda Project , a ministry to the homeless of Philadelphia. The Norbertine community at Daylesford Abbey continues to be actively engaged in this ministry today. Norbertines from Daylesford Abbey work in education as well, serving at Archmere Academy.

Spirituality and Retreat Center
The Spirituality Center  at Daylesford Abbey offers a variety of faith-nurturing experiences and programs, such as private and group retreats, seminars and other in-person and online programs, in an environment of hospitality and inclusivity — in the spirit and charism of the Order’s  founder, St. Norbert, known as a minister of peace & reconciliation.

References

Daylesford Abbey.
Paoli.
Roman Catholic.
Canons Regular of Premontre.
Divine Office.
Rule of St. Augustine.
The Norbertines.
Saint Norbert.
Abbey of Berne.
Norbertine Abbey.
Archmere Academy.
Saint John Neumann High SChool.
Abbot Domenic Rossi, O.Praem
Ss. John Neumann and Maria Goretti High School.
St. Norbert Paraish.
St. Gabriel Parish.
Bethesda Project.
Spirituality Center.

Further reading

External links
 

Premonstratensian monasteries in the United States
Buildings and structures in Chester County, Pennsylvania
Religious buildings and structures in Pennsylvania